Carolus de Tilly or Carlo de Tilly (1642–1698) was a Roman Catholic prelate who served as Bishop of Monopoli (1697–1698) and Bishop of Acerra (1692–1697).

Biography
Carolus de Tilly was born in Villerupt in 1642 and ordained a priest on 19 September 1665.
On 21 January 1692, he was appointed during the papacy of Pope Innocent XII as Bishop of Acerra.
On 27 January 1692, he was consecrated bishop by Marcantonio Barbarigo, Bishop of Corneto e Montefiascone, with Giovan Donato Giannoni Alitto, Bishop of Ruvo, and Pietro Vecchia (bishop), Bishop of Molfetta, serving as co-consecrators.
On 3 June 1697, he was appointed during the papacy of Pope Innocent XII as Bishop of Monopoli.
He served as Bishop of Monopoli until his death in 1698.

Episcopal succession
While bishop, he was the principal co-consecrator of:
Giovanni Stefano Pastori, Bishop of Ventimiglia (1695);
Vincenzo della Marra, Bishop of Alessano (1695); and
Daniele Scoppa, Bishop of Nola (1695).

References

External links and additional sources
 (for Chronology of Bishops) 
 (for Chronology of Bishops) 
 (for Chronology of Bishops) 
 (for Chronology of Bishops) 

17th-century Italian Roman Catholic bishops
Bishops appointed by Pope Innocent XII
Bishops of Monopoli
1642 births
1698 deaths